ColorADD is a sign code for aiding color blind people to recognise colors, developed by Portuguese graphic designer and professor at the University of Minho, Miguel Neiva. It consists of geometric shapes representing colors and color combinations. The app won the accessibility category of the 2013 Vodafone Foundation Mobile For Good Europe Awards.

Code 

The code is based on five base signs: two triangles (one angled upwards and the other angled downwards), one diagonal line, one solid square box and one empty square box representing black, white and the primary colors: red (magenta), blue (cyan), and yellow. Colors derived from other colors have the symbols of the combined colors, creating derivative colors (orange, green, purple and brown) and dark or white tones. Metalized colors like silver or gold are shown with a left parenthesis on the symbols.

Uses and recognitions 

Since its creation, Coloradd has been applied in various services, mainly in Portugal:

Hospitals: on patient wristbands, pill bottles and path lines
Schools: Viarco coloring pencils and students' note books
Transports: subway maps, traffic lights and parking lots
Accessibility: paint cans, groceries, postage services, energy monitoring
It was also recognised by Buenos Aires University and TEDx Oporto.

In September 2017, Mattel launched a colorblind-friendly version of Uno that utilizes ColorADD.

Fees and usage restrictions 
This system is not in public domain nor free licensed and it's copyrighted. Usage must be licensed by the for-profit private company Miguel Neiva & Associados - design gráfico, Lda. and fees are not public. According to ColorADD "license fee is adjusted to the partner's profile". There is a pro bono model only for schools and universities managed by the nonprofit NGO ColorADD.Social.

References

Further reading
 A Practical Guide to Designing with Data by Brian Suda. 2010. Five Simple Steps., pages 61–62
 Portuguese designer becomes "hero" for the colourblind. 21 Mar 2012, Agence France-Presse
 Making More Health, Miguel Neiva
 icograda: International Council of Graphic Design Associations description and Reinventing the Color Wheel. icograda International Council of Communication Design
 Zero project, Innovative Practices 2014 on Accessibility: Colour identification system for the colourblind

External links 

 

Assistive technology
Augmentative and alternative communication
Disability rights
Portuguese inventions
Visual disturbances and blindness